Charles Belair (1760–1802) was Aide-de-Camp and lieutenant of Toussaint Louverture, Head of the 7th demi-brigade, Commandant of l'Arcahaye and Former lieutenant of Biassou. He was also a nephew of Toussaint Louverture. In 1796, he married Sanite Belair.

Haitian Revolution 
From December 25, 1791, a few months after the events of August 22, he was found signing with his commander Biassou a letter of high political significance addressed to the abee de Lahaye.In the summer of 1794, he spent with Toussaint in the service of France. With the organization of the troops in demi-brigades in the spring of 1795, he was integrated into a battalion of the 7th before becoming Colonel to replace Desrouleaux. During the war in the South, which he waged without excess of zeal, he remained in this post until the campaign in the East. Finally promoted brigadier general in January 1801, after the campaign which earned him distinctions, he retained command of Arcahaie until the landing of Leclerc's expeditionary forces in the West in February 1802 as General Boudet's troops approached, he set fire to the square before withdrawing with funds from the public treasury and part of the population in Les Matheux. After the fall of Crête-à-Pierrot at the end of March, Belair abandoned the region to fall back to the Cahos where he was to swell the staff of the former governor. At the time of his submission, on May 6, Toussaint Louverture obtained from Captain General Leclerc pardon for three of his generals: Dessalines, Vernet and Belair. Transferred on May 26 from his post of commander of Arcahaie to Verrettes where he will settle on one of his properties. Henry Christophe and Him fought in Savannah, Georgia for the cause of the independence of the United States, covered himself with glory during the Southern War.

Capture and execution 

The news of the arrest followed by the deportation of Toussaint on June 11 will plunge back into rebellion. He now has Dessalines in front of him, whom he accuses of having betrayed Toussaint, his benefactor. Having first obtained some success, occupying the heights of Artibonite with part of the colonial troops who had been in the pay of General Charles Victoire Emmanuel Leclerc and had passed with the insurgents, Leclerc sent Dessalines against him, as much to compromise the one here vis-à-vis the Haitians, than to spare its own troops. After the deportation of Toussaint Louverture, he immediately went to Arcahaie and raised the banner of revolt on August 22, 1802. To force him to surrender, they used disloyal means by imprisoning his family. Learning of the arrest of his wife and mother, Bélair left his hiding place; he was arrested and delivered to Leclerc. The latter formed a commission to judge him, made up of General Dugua, president, brigadier generals Clerveaux, Duverseau. Charles Bélair was condemned to the gallows and, on October 15, 1802, He died by firing squad, as did his wife Sanité.

Legacy 

The Arcahaie high school, which until then had been named François Duvalier, became the Charles-Belair high school in 1986.

References 
https://face2faceafrica.com/article/the-love-story-of-two-haitian-revolutionaries-who-were-killed-together-by-the-french-in-1802

http://www.sandrineberges.com/liberty-in-thy-name/a-woman-in-the-haitian-revolution-sanite-belair

https://elap1804.com/suzanne-sanite-belair/

https://kentakepage.com/sanite-belair-the-tigress-of-haiti/

https://www.jstor.org/stable/165202?seq=1

https://www.cambridge.org/core/journals/journal-of-inter-american-studies/article/jeanjacques-dessalines-and-charles-belair/33FAB78CC14E124E9C2AD5B46AA5BAAF

https://www.youtube.com/watch?v=oRbNRrFe-Rk

Haitian revolutionaries
1760 births
1802 deaths
Executed French people
People executed by firing squad